Most! is a Czech comedy TV series. It was made in collaboration between Petr Kolečko and Jan Prušinovský. It was their sixth work.

The story takes place in city of Most located in North Bohemia. Rather limited hero lives there - loser Luděk Říha. The series premiered on 2 May 2018 at the Serial Killer Festival. The first episode of the series was introduced on 29 November 2018. The series premiered on 7 January 2019.The last episode was broadcast on 25 February the same year.

The premiere of the last episode of this show was watched by 1.61 million people, making it the most successful series on Czech Television in more than the last five years. The premiere of the first episode had a viewership of 1.3 million viewers, with the number of viewers increasing with each episode. Other viewers also watched the show on the Internet. The series had the highest viewership among the 30- to 44-year-old group, as well as among the 15- to 29-year-old audience group.

Cast
Martin Hofmann as Luděk Říha known as Luďan
Zdeněk Godla as Franta Gondek, Roma worker of town services
Michal Isteník as Eda, owner of Severka restaurant
Vladimír Škultéty as Ivan Čočka known as Čočkin
Cyril Drozda as Květoslav Toman
Erika Stárková as Dáša Říhová (formerly Pavel Říha), Luděk's transsexual sibling
voiced by Jan Cina
Filip František Červenka as Tonda Říha
Jitka Čvančarová as Ilona, Luďan's ex-wife
Jiří Schmitzer as Karel Juliš
Taťjana Medvecká as Julišová,
Jan Řezníček as David Juliš
Leoš Noha as Roman Vepřek
Klaudia Dudová as Žaneta

Episodes

Production
Most! was mostly created in a real environments of the eponymous location, namely in restaurants Severka and U Kalendů, at the autodrome, Cascade hotel, the city hospital, Central shopping center, the Church of the Assumption of the Virgin Mary, the local library or in Obrnice-Chanov. During the 65-day preparation of the series, no less than 821 members of the extras performed in it.

Hungarian remake
Hungarian TV series Keki Petra is a Hungarian remake set in the town of Kazincbarcika in the county of Borsod-Abaúj-Zemplén in the northeast of the country; the location was chosen because it has common features with the North Bohemian one.

References

External links
Website (in Czech)
IMDb.com

Czech comedy television series
2019 Czech television series debuts
Czech Television original programming
Czech Lion Awards winners (television series)
Czech LGBT-related television shows